Amy Dowden (born 10 August 1990) is a Welsh professional ballroom and Latin American dancer from Caerphilly, Wales, best known for her appearances on the BBC One television show Strictly Come Dancing. Dowden joined the BBC series in 2017, and in 2019, she was a finalist in the seventeenth series with TV presenter Karim Zeroual. Dowden and her partner Ben Jones are former British National Latin Dance Champions. She has the Guinness World Record for the most back-Charleston kick-steps in 30 seconds (2022).

Early life
Dowden was born in Caerphilly, Wales and began dancing at the age of eight. Alongside her partner Ben Jones, she became British National Latin Dance Champion in 2017, and the couple were the first all-British pair to win the championships in over thirty years. Other successes include becoming British Dance Federation Champions, English Closed Champions and Welsh Closed and Open Champions. Dowden is also a four-time British National Finalist, and a World Championship semi-finalist, and she remains one of the highest-ranking Ballroom and Latin American professional dancers in the UK.

Strictly Come Dancing

Dowden is the first Welsh professional to take part in the BBC's Strictly Come Dancing.

Highest and Lowest Scoring Per Dance

Performances with Brian Conley 
In 2017 Dowden appeared as a professional dancer in the fifteenth series, partnered with comedian Brian Conley. They made it to week 5 of the competition.

 number indicates Brian & Amy were at the bottom of the leaderboard

Performances with Danny John-Jules 
Dowden returned for her second series in 2018 where she was partnered with Danny John-Jules. The couple were awarded the first 10 score of the series by Darcey Bussell for their Jive to "Flip, Flop and Fly" in week 5. They were eliminated in Week 8 after losing a dance-off to Graeme Swann and Oti Mabuse; their elimination came days after controversial bullying allegations, with tabloids reporting that John-Jules had reduced Dowden to tears.

 score awarded by guest judge Alfonso Riberio
 number indicates Danny & Amy were at the top of the leaderboard
 number indicates Danny & Amy were at the bottom of the leaderboard

Performances with Karim Zeroual 
In 2019 Dowden appeared as a professional dancer in the seventeenth series of the show, partnered with CBBC presenter Karim Zeroual. The pair received the first perfect 40 of the series for their Jive in Week 11.

 score awarded by guest judge Alfonso Riberio
 number indicates Karim & Amy were at the top of the leaderboard

Performances with JJ Chalmers
In Series 18, Dowden partnered television presenter JJ Chalmers. They finished in 6th place, reaching musical week. The scores for this series were out of 30.

  was awarded by Anton Du Beke who filled in for Motsi Mabuse as judge for Week 4 and 5.

Performances with Tom Fletcher
In Series 19, Dowden partnered musician Tom Fletcher. On 26 September it was announced that both had contracted COVID-19 and would miss the following week's show. On 21 November, in week 9 of the competition, they were the eighth couple to be eliminated, after a dance-off against Rhys Stephenson and Nancy Xu.

  was awarded by Cynthia Erivo who filled in for Craig Revel Horwood as judge for Week 9.
 number indicates Tom & Amy were at the bottom of the leaderboard

Performances with James Bye
In Series 20, Dowden partnered EastEnders actor James Bye. They were eliminated in week 6 of the competition, finishing in 11th place. 

 number indicates James & Amy were at the bottom of the leaderboard

Strictly Come Dancing Christmas Special
She danced with CBeebies presenter George Webster for the 2022 Strictly Come Dancing Christmas Special.

Dance tours and other professional engagements
In 2019, Dowden headlined her own tour, ‘Here Come The Girls’, with fellow professional dancers Dianne Buswell and Chloe Hewitt.

Dowden has also taken part in the Strictly Come Dancing Live! tour since 2018. In 2020, she performed with a celebrity partner for the first time on tour, her 2019 partner Karim Zeroual.

Dowden has announced her appearance with Jones at the 2022 'Dancing With The Stars Weekend' at the Celtic Manor Resort in Newport.

Personal life
Dowden is married to Ben Jones, her professional dance partner, and together they run the Art in Motion dance school in Cradley Heath, West Midlands.

Dowden has suffered from Crohn's disease since she was a child. In May 2019, she spoke out about the effect the condition has had on her career as a professional dancer. In October 2020, the BBC aired a documentary about Dowden's experiences of living with the condition. The documentary won a BAFTA Cymru award.

References

External links

Living people
Welsh female dancers
British ballroom dancers
21st-century British dancers
People from Caerphilly
1990 births
People with Crohn's disease